Fillmore Airport  is located adjacent to Fillmore, Saskatchewan, Canada.

See also 
List of airports in Saskatchewan

References 

Registered aerodromes in Saskatchewan
Fillmore No. 96, Saskatchewan